Joe Harris may refer to:

Sportspeople
 Joe Harris (first baseman) (1891–1959), American first baseman in Major League Baseball
 Joe Harris (pitcher) (1882–1966), pitcher in Major League Baseball
 Joe Harris (basketball) (born 1991), American basketball player
 Joe Harris (American football) (born 1952), former American football linebacker in the National Football League
 Joe Harris (footballer) (1896–1933), Scottish footballer for Partick Thistle, Middlesbrough, Newcastle United, and York City

Others
 Joe Harris (actor) (1870–1953), silent film actor
 Joe Harris (illustrator) (1928–2017), American illustrator and storyboard artist, created Underdog, the Trix Rabbit and other characters
 Joe Frank Harris (born 1936), American politician
 Joe Harris (mathematician) (born 1951), mathematician
 Joe Harris (writer), filmmaker and comic book creator

See also
 Joseph Harris (disambiguation)